John Hedley Lewis  (October 1908 – 28 December 1976) was an English landowner, farmer and local politician, who served as Chairman of Kesteven County Council and Lincolnshire County Council.

Born in October 1908, John Hedley Lewis lived at Birkholm Manor in Corby Glen, a village in Lincolnshire. He went to school at Stubbington House, Fareham, and Malvern College, before graduating from Sidney Sussex College, Cambridge, with a degree in mathematics. Lewis served in World War II as an RAF intelligence officer, and joined Kesteven County Council in 1954. He served on it for two decades; by 1964, he was an alderman and its vice-chairman, and he went on to chair it for five years, before becoming chairman of Lincolnshire County Council from its inception as a successor to Kesteven CC in 1973, to November 1976, when he resigned on health grounds, being succeeded by Councillor Clifford Hall. He was appointed a Deputy Lieutenant of the county on 31 January 1972.

Lewis unsuccessfully contested the parliamentary seat of Kettering as a Conservative at the 1959 and 1964 general elections.

Lewis, who was a keen sportsman (representing Gloucestershire at tennis), died on 28 December 1976, aged 68.

References 

1908 births
1976 deaths
Members of Lincolnshire County Council
Conservative Party (UK) parliamentary candidates
Members of Kesteven County Council